Lothian Thistle Hutchison Vale Football Club (LTHV) are a senior non-league football club based in Edinburgh, Scotland.

History

Founded in 1969 as an amateur works team for Lloyds Finance, they initially played as Lloyds & Scottish prior to renaming themselves Lothian Thistle.

The club originally competed in the Lothian amateur league before a successful spell in the Caledonian Amateur Football League. They then moved up to senior status when they joined the East of Scotland Football League in 1995, gaining promotion to the Premier Division two years later in 1997.

The club is linked with the youth football club Hutchison Vale, and changed their name to Lothian Thistle Hutchison Vale before the start of the 2011–12 season to reflect this.

LTHV won the East of Scotland Premier Division title for the first time in the 2013–14 season, repeating this success in the 2014–15 season. They were runners-up in 2015–16 and won the league for the third time in 2016–17, although they did not take part in the play-off for promotion to the Lowland League because they were ineligible for licensing reasons. They narrowly lost out on the 2017–18 title after defeat to Kelty Hearts on the final day of the season.

The club reached the 3rd round of the Scottish Cup in 2017–18 beating League Two side Stirling Albion 5-3 away from home, before losing 1-7 at home to St Mirren. They became SFA members in 2018, allowing them automatic entry into the Scottish Cup.

LTHV gained promotion back to the Premier Division for 2020–21 after winning First Division Conference A in the curtailed 2019–20 season.

Ground

The club operates at Saughton Enclosure in the west side of Edinburgh, where they have been since 1998.  The ground can accommodate up to 1,000 spectators.

Youth
The Hutchison Vale youth team was founded in 1940. Its first intake of players included future professionals Tommy Younger and George Farm.

A full list of 'graduates' was released by the BBC in April 2019 - Grant Brebner, Lee Bullen, Mark Burchill, Gary Caldwell, Steven Caldwell, John Collins, Alan Combe, Peter Cormack, Darren Dods, Andrew Driver, George Farm, Alfred Finnbogason, Darren Fletcher, Ryan Flynn, Paul Hanlon, Kevin Harper, John Hughes, Danny Galbraith, Gary Glen, Leigh Griffiths, John Inglis, Danny Lennon, Gary Locke, Gary Mason, Eddie May, Allan McGregor, Steven McLean, Marc McNulty, Michael McIndoe, Kenny Miller, Grant Murray, Ian Murray, Gary Naysmith, Sam Nicholson, Colin Nish, Garry O'Connor, Allan Preston, Derek Riordan, Scott Robinson, Michael Stewart, Danny Swanson, Paul Telfer, Kevin Thomson, Gregor Townsend, Steven Tweed, Mickey Weir, Steven Whittaker, Danny Wilson, Tommy Younger

In April 2019 it was described as "Scotland's most fruitful football academy".

Women
Hutchison Vale also have a women's section who play in SWPL 2, the second division of the Scottish Women's Premier League.

In 2018 they merged with Edinburgh University Ladies and were renamed Edinburgh University Hutchison Vale, playing their home games at the University's Peffermill Sports Ground, Edinburgh. However this partnership ended at the end of the season, and they reverted to the Hutchison Vale name for 2019.

Hutchison Vale Ladies won the Scottish Cup in 1993 & 1994.

Honours
As Lothian Thistle prior to the 2011–12 season

East of Scotland Football League
Winners (3) : 2013–14, 2014–15, 2016–17
Runners-up (2) : 2015–16, 2017–18
East of Scotland Football League First Division
Winners : 1996–97, 2019–20 (Conference A)
East of Scotland City Cup
 Winners: 2016–17
Runners-up : 2014–15
East of Scotland Qualifying Cup
 Winners: 1996-97, 2014–15
Runners-up (2) : 2016–17, 2017–18
East of Scotland League Cup
 Winners: 2017–18
King Cup
 Winners: 2003–04
Runners-up (2) : 2015–16, 2016–17 
Alex Jack Cup
 Winners (5): 2000–01, 2003–04, 2005–06, 2007–08, 2016–17
Runners-up (6): 1995–96, 1997–98, 2002–03, 2010–11, 2013–14, 2016–17 
South & East Cup Winners Shield
 Winners: 2016–17

References

External links
 
 

 
Association football clubs established in 1969
Football clubs in Scotland
Football clubs in Edinburgh
1969 establishments in Scotland
East of Scotland Football League teams
Works association football teams in Scotland